Justine Henin was the defending champion, but lost in the semifinals to Eleni Daniilidou.

Unseeded Daniilidou won the title, defeating Elena Dementieva 3–6, 6–2, 6–3 in the final.

Seeds
The first two seeds received a bye into the second round.

Draw

Finals

Top half

Bottom half

External links
 Main draw (WTA)

Women's Singles
Singles